The MTs 7 (МЦ 7) is a family of Soviet and Russian double-barreled high-quality custom hunting shotguns, combination guns and rifles.

History 

The first version of MTs 7 (MTs 7-1) was designed in late 1950s by TsKIB SOO as target rifle for competition shooting, although later it was redesigned and since 1960 it was sold as high-quality hunting weapon.

MTs 7 custom guns were among the most expensive of all hunting firearms made in USSR. 
 In August 1981, the price of one custom MTs 7 smoothbore shotgun was 1,000 roubles and the price of one custom MTs 7 double-barreled rifle was 1,200 roubles
 In December 1987, the price of one custom MTs7-20 shotgun was 1,500 roubles, the price of one MTs7-12 shotgun was 1,700 roubles, the price of one MTs7-07 or MTs7-09 rifle was 1,800 roubles.

In 1990s it was announced that new MTs 7-17 combination gun will be made. However, due to the economic crisis in the Russian Federation, production of all versions of MTs 7 was greatly reduced.

Design 
MTs 7 is an over and under hammerless gun, with one barrel above the other. The barrels are detachable.

It is equipped with safety mechanism and ejector.

All guns have a walnut shoulder stock (with or without cheekpiece) and fore-end, some of them were decorated with engravings.

MTs 7 hunting rifles and combination guns can be equipped with optical sight PO-4×34 (ПО-4×34) made by Zagorsk Optical-Mechanical Plant.

Variants 
 MTs 7-1 (МЦ 7-1) - first model, 6.5mm target rifle with 750mm barrels and diopter sight (4 - 5 kg)
 MTs 7-01 (МЦ 7-01) - second model, 6.5mm hunting rifle with 600mm barrels (3.25 - 3.75 kg)
 MTs 7-02 (МЦ 7-02) - third model, 7.62×54mmR hunting rifle with 600mm barrels (3.5 - 4.0 kg)
 MTs 7-07 (МЦ 7-07) - 7.62×51mm hunting rifle with 600mm barrels
 MTs 7-09 (МЦ 7-09) - 9×53mmR double-barreled hunting rifle with 600mm barrels (3.4 - 3.6 kg). This model has been produced since 1968. It was equipped with PO-4-1 (ПО-4-1) optical sight and rubber recoil pad on its shoulder stock
 MTs 7-12 (МЦ 7-12) - a 12/70 smoothbore double-barreled hunting shotgun with 750mm barrels (3.0 - 3.3 kg)
 MTs 7-12S (МЦ 7-12С) - a version of MTs 7-12 shotgun with new trigger mechanism
 MTs 7-17 (МЦ 7-17) - a combination gun (12 gauge smoothbore barrel and 7.62×54mmR rifled barrel)
 MTs 7-20 (МЦ 7-20) - a 20/70 smoothbore double-barreled hunting shotgun with 675mm barrels (2.6 - 2.9 kg)

References

Sources 
 Охотничье двуствольное ружьё МЦ 7 // Охотничье, спортивное огнестрельное оружие. Каталог. М., 1958. стр.26-27
 Э. В. Штейнгольд. Всё об охотничьем ружье. 2-е изд., испр. и доп. М., «Лесная промышленность», 1978.
 М. М. Блюм, И. Б. Шишкин. Охотничье ружьё. М., «Лесная промышленность», 1983. стр.89-90
 М. М. Блюм, И. Б. Шишкин. Твоё ружьё. М., "Физкультура и спорт", 1989. стр.78
 Ружьё двуствольное МЦ 7 // Охотничье и спортивное оружие. М., Внешторгиздат. 1989.
 Виктор Рон. МЦ 7-12С: надёжность и универсальность // журнал "Оружие", No. 12, 2018. стр.63-64 - ISSN 1728-9203 

Double-barreled shotguns of the Soviet Union
Double-barreled shotguns of Russia
Combination guns
TsKIB SOO products
9×53mmR firearms